John G. Hildebrand is an American neuroscientist, currently Honors Professor and Regents Professor at University of Arizona and has been elected as Fellow of the American Academy of Arts and Sciences, International Society for Neuroethology, Royal Entomological Society of London, American Association for the Advancement of Science and Entomological Society of America, awarded an honorary degree by Universitá degli Studi di Cagliari and named Einstein Professor at Chinese Academy of Sciences.  In 1964 he received a BA in biology from Harvard University followed by a doctorate in biochemistry from Rockefeller University in 1969. He was elected to the American Philosophical Society in 2014.

References

Year of birth missing (living people)
Living people
University of Arizona faculty
American neuroscientists
Harvard University alumni
Rockefeller University alumni
Fellows of the American Academy of Arts and Sciences
Members of the United States National Academy of Sciences
Members of the American Philosophical Society
Members of the German Academy of Sciences Leopoldina
Members of the Norwegian Academy of Science and Letters
Royal Norwegian Society of Sciences and Letters
Fellows of the Royal Entomological Society